The Superior Institute of Religious Sciences of St. Thomas Aquinas is an institution of higher education in Kyiv (Ukraine), conducted by the Dominican Friars of the Vicariate General of Russia and Ukraine and, affiliated to the Pontifical University of St. Thomas Aquinas (Angelicum).

See also
Pontifical University of St. Thomas Aquinas (Angelicum)

Footnotes

External links
Superior Institute of Religious Sciences of St. Thomas Aquinas 
Pontifical University of St. Thomas Aquinas (Angelicum) 
Dominican Vicariate General of Russia and Ukraine 

Dominican universities and colleges
Catholic universities and colleges in Ukraine
Universities and colleges in Kyiv
Educational institutions established in 1992
1992 establishments in Ukraine